Abhimanyu (born ) is an Asian elephant who, from 2020 has been the lead elephant and the carrier of the Golden Howdah at the Mysore Dasara in India. He was named after Abhimanyu, the son of the Arjuna from the Hindu epic Mahabharatha.

References

Elephants in India
Individual elephants